The Belgian Civil Aviation Authority (also known as "Direction générale du Transport aérien" (DGTA) in French, or "Directoraat-generaal Luchtvaart" (DGLV) in Dutch) is part of the FPS Mobility and Transport in Belgium, directed until 2010 by Secretary of State Etienne Schouppe (CD&V). At this moment , the director-general of the BCAA is Frank Durinckx (a.i.).The BCAA is responsible for the investigation of Aircraft Accidents and Incidents, Licensing, International and EU Affairs, Quality Services, Company Approvals, Airspace and Airports and Air Navigation Services in Belgium.

Aircraft accidents and incidents investigation
In Belgium, civil aviation accidents are investigated by the Belgian Civil Aviation Authority (Federal Public Service Mobility and Transport – Belgian Civil Aviation Authority (BCAA) –Air Accident Investigation Unit) – with the full cooperation of the airline and other interested parties.

No airline representative can speculate publicly on the cause of the accident because only the Belgian Civil Aviation Authority (BCAA) and its professional investigators can determine the “probable cause”.

While the Belgian Civil Aviation Authority (BCAA) alone must make that finding, it works closely with experts from the airline, the Belgian Civil Aviation Authority (BCAA), aircraft and engine manufacturers, and professional organizations representing pilots, flight attendants and air traffic controllers.

Airlines involved in the accident stand ready to support any investigation, with an accident team prepared to fly to an accident scene on short notice. These teams include specialists in such areas as safety, flight, maintenance and emergency procedures.

With these experts assisting, the Belgian Civil Aviation Authority (BCAA) will examine the accident scene, interview witnesses, analyse cockpit and data recorders from the airplane, and, if necessary, conduct a public hearing.

Because of the complexity of modern aircraft and the multitude of factors that can contribute to an accident, an investigation can take months, even years, to complete.

Given the need for careful analysis, it is irresponsible for airline representatives or others to rush judgements on the cause of the accident/incident before a methodical investigation is completed.

Accident investigation reports have been made public on the department's website.

Pilot licensing
Most Belgian pilot's licenses are managed at Joint Aviation Requirements (JAR) level, and are issued and maintained by the BCAA on behalf of Joint Aviation Authorities: Private Pilot License, Commercial Pilot Licence, ATPL. Some types of license are not yet under JAR control, and these are issued by the BCAA under its own authority: ultralight, balloon. Glider licensing is delegated to regional federations.

External links

Website of the Department of Transportation and Mobility 

Civil aviation in Belgium
Civil aviation authorities in Europe
Transport organisations based in Belgium